The Andreas-Gryphius Prize is a prestigious literary prize in Germany, named after the German poet Andreas Gryphius (1616–1664). The prize is awarded to authors and translators whose work reflects German culture and history in Central, Eastern and Southern Europe and that contributes to understanding between Germany and its Eastern neighbors.

The prize was established in Düsseldorf in 1957; since 1990 it has been sponsored by the Künstlergilde (artists' guild) in Esslingen, and awarded in the city of Glogów (German: Glogau), Gryphius's birthplace.

Winners 

 1957 Heinz Piontek – star prize
 1959 August Scholtis – star prize
 1962 Karl Dedecius – promotional award 
 1963 Wolfgang Schwarz – honorary prize
 1965
 Josef Mühlberger
 Peter Jokostra
 1966 Johannes Urzidil – star prize
 1967
 Arnold Ulitz
 Horst Bienek – honorary prize
 1968 Rudolf Pannwitz
 1969
 Manfred Bieler
 Oskar Pastior – promotional award 
 1970
 Kurt Heynicke
 Dagmar Nick – honorary prize
 Barbara König – honorary prize
 1971 Wolfgang Koeppen – star prize
 1972
 Walter Kempowski – honorary prize
 Ilse Tielsch – honorary prize
 Georg Hermanowski – honorary prize
 Gertrud Fussenegger
 1973 Hans-Jürgen Heise – honorary prize
 1974 Peter Huchel
 1975 Frank Thiess
 1976
 Karin Struck – star prize; Carl Guesmer – promotional award 
 Tamara Ehlert
 1977
 Reiner Kunze – star prize
 Rose Ausländer
 Rudolf Günter Langer
 1978
 Hanns Gottschalk
 Arno Surminski
 1979 Siegfried Lenz – star prize
 1980 Saul Friedländer
 1981
 Ernst Vasovec
 Ulrich Schacht – promotional award 
 1982 Franz Tumler
 1983
 Horst Bienek
 Ulla Berkéwicz – promotional award 
 1984 Hans Sahl
 1985 Ernst Günther Bleisch (Philosopher Günther Anders had rejected the prize for political reasons.)
 1986 Hans Werner Richter
 1987
 Otfried Preußler for his complete works
 Helga Lippelt – promotional award 
 1988 Martin Gregor-Dellin
 1989
 Ilse Tielsch – star prize for her complete works
 Michael Wieck – honorary prize for Zeugnis vom Untergang Königsbergs [Account of the downfall of Königsberg]
 1990
 Peter Härtling – star prize
 Christian Saalberg – honorary prize
 1991
 Ota Filip
 Helga Schütz – honorary prize
 Franz Hodjak – honorary prize
 1992
 Janosch (Horst Eckert) – star prize
 Paweł Huelle – promotional award 
 1993 Dagmar Nick
 1994 Hans-Jürgen Heise
 1995 Andrzej Szczypiorski – star prize
 1996
 Jiří Gruša
 Ruth Klüger – honorary prize
 Olly Komenda-Soentgerath – honorary prize
 1997 Karl Dedecius – star prize
 1998 Milo Dor
 1999 Stefan Chwin for his complete works, especially for the novel Tod in Danzig [Death in Danzig]
 2009 Arno Surminski
 2010 
 2011 
 2012 
 2013 
 2014 , Leonie Ossowski
 2015 
 2016 
 2017 
 2018 
 2019 
 2020

References

German literary awards
1957 establishments in Germany
Awards established in 1957